Great Ballard School is a co-educational independent school for children aged 2½ to 16 years. It was founded in 1924 and set up at its current location in Eartham, near Chichester, West Sussex, England, in 1961. The headmaster is Matthew King.

Eartham House
The school's main building, Eartham House, was originally built in 1800 and was occupied by the poet William Hayley. The house was subsequently purchased by William Huskisson, a prominent nineteenth-century politician who was a member of parliament for Chichester and served in the governments of Lord Liverpool and the Duke of Wellington. Huskisson, despite his high-profile political career, is best remembered for the tragic manner of his death – he was run over by George Stephenson's locomotive engine The Rocket at the opening of the Liverpool to Manchester railway line in 1830.
 
Eartham House was entirely rebuilt in 1905 to designs by the architect Edwin Lutyens, but some Regency decorations and fireplaces are still retained in one room. The house was listed as a Grade II listed building by the Ministry of Works in 1958.

School history
Since its founding, the school has had many homes, including the original site at New Milton Hampshire. It remained there until the Second World War, when it was relocated to Dorset and then to Stowell Park in Gloucestershire, where it stayed until 1947. For a short time it was then at Cordwalles, Camberley, Surrey, where the Queen had carried out her ATS training, until a fire forced a temporary return to Stowell Park. After repairs, the school remained in Camberley until moving to its current location in 1961, chosen because the area around its home at Camberley had become more urbanised.

In the autumn term of 2009, the Great Ballard School began "hosting a group of pupils from Fang Cao Di International School in Beijing, China, who have been experiencing British teaching methods as well as sharing knowledge of their own culture". The exchange students participated in the normal class schedule and were also taken on a number of field trips to famous British locations, including Windsor Castle and Stonehenge.

Curriculum
Though children from the ages of two and a half to sixteen attend the school, Great Ballard School has a wide number of class subjects, including "ICT, technology, art & design, PE, music and drama". The focus during the school year is to make the students prepared for the Common Entrance Examination and for other scholarship examinations that the students will be taking at age 13. While many of the students under the age of seven take classes such as "music and movement, drama, PE, swimming, computing, and cooking", it is at the age of seven that the "prep school" classes start.

Notable alumni
 Julien Fountain, cricketer and baseball player
 Richard Meredith, author
 Honeysuckle Weeks, actress

References

External links
 School website

Private schools in West Sussex
Grade II listed educational buildings
Grade II listed buildings in West Sussex
Works of Edwin Lutyens in England